The Sleep of the Island is a Romanian film from 1994 directed by Mircea Veroiu, inspired from the novel The Second Messenger written by Bujor Nedelcovici.

Plot

The topic of the film points out the condition of an intellectual in time of totalitarian dictatorship, which subjugated an island from where you can not run. The only alternative is collaborating with power and internment in a rehabilitation institute. A famous writer returns to his homeland to try to confront the terror of an oppressive regime, but he ends up being himself corrupted-thanks to the aberrant system.

Cast

 Ovidiu Iuliu Moldovan - Daniel Raynal
 Marcel Iureș - Jean Elby
 Ștefan Sileanu - The island governor
 Elena Albu - Micheline Rolebon
 Dan Condurache - poet Victor Labri
 Mircea Albulescu - Professor Fontaine
 Natașa Raab - Hélène
 Costel Constantin - president of the Ideological College
 Vlad Rădescu - archaeologist Marcel
 Corina Dănilă - Christine
 Rodica Mandache - Veronica, Victor's wife
 Ion Chelaru - Vanghelie

Production

The film was produced by Solaris-Film, in co-production with Star-Film, Cinerom R.A. and the Bucharest's Cinematographic Studio S.A., the film being shot at Buftea. It have been used frames from the films Sezonul Pescarusilor (1985) and Detașamentul Concordia (1980).

Awards

The film obtained Jury's special prize ("Silver Makhila") at the Latin World Festival of Cinematography from Arachon - France 1995.

References

External links
 Somnul Insulei -  Cinemagia
 

Romanian drama films
1994 films
Films based on Romanian novels
Films directed by Mircea Veroiu